The 2022–23 season is the 126th season of competitive football in Scotland. The domestic season began on 9 July 2022 with the first Scottish League Cup group stage matches, and the first round of matches in the 2022–23 Scottish Premiership were played on 30 July.

Transfer deals

League competitions

Scottish Premiership

Scottish Championship

Scottish League One

Scottish League Two

Non-league football

Level 5

Level 6

Highland

Lowland

Honours

Cup honours

Non-league honours

Individual honours

PFA Scotland awards

SFWA awards

Scottish clubs in Europe

Summary

Celtic
UEFA Champions League

Celtic entered the 2022–23 UEFA Champions League in the group stage, having won the 2021–22 Scottish Premiership.

Rangers
UEFA Champions League

Rangers entered the 2022–23 UEFA Champions League in the third qualifying round, having finished second in the 2021–22 Scottish Premiership.

Heart of Midlothian
UEFA Europa League

Hearts entered the 2022–23 UEFA Europa League in the playoff round, having finished third in the 2021–22 Scottish Premiership.

UEFA Europa Conference League

Dundee United
UEFA Europa Conference League

Dundee United entered the 2022–23 UEFA Europa Conference League in the third qualifying round, after finishing fourth in the 2021–22 Scottish Premiership.

Motherwell

UEFA Europa Conference League
Motherwell entered the 2022–23 UEFA Europa Conference League in the second qualifying round, after finishing fifth in the 2021–22 Scottish Premiership.

Scotland national team

Women's football

League honours

Cup honours

Individual honours

SWPL awards

Scottish Women's Premier League

UEFA Women's Champions League
Rangers and Glasgow City qualified for the Women's Champions League.

Rangers

Glasgow City

Scotland women's national team

Deaths
1 July: Drew Busby, 74, Third Lanark, Partick Thistle, Airdrieonians, Heart of Midlothian, Morton and Queen of the South forward; Queen of the South manager.
2 July: Andy Goram, 58, Hibernian, Rangers, Motherwell, Hamilton Academical, Queen of the South, Elgin City and Scotland goalkeeper.
8 July: Harry Mowbray, 75, Cowdenbeath and St Mirren defender.
9 July: Davie Robb, 74, Aberdeen, Dunfermline Athletic and Scotland forward.
9 July: Adam Strachan, 35, Partick Thistle, Ross County, Clyde, Arbroath, Dumbarton and Albion Rovers midfielder.
10 July: Ken Armstrong, 63, Kilmarnock defender.
1 August: John Hughes, 79, Celtic and Scotland forward; Stranraer manager.
11 August: Pat Liney, 86, Dundee and St Mirren goalkeeper.
August: Billy Hodgson, 87, St. Johnstone and Hamilton Academical outside-right.
8 September: Dave Smith, Dundee manager.
11 September: Chris Robinson, 71, Heart of Midlothian chairman and chief executive.
12 September: Ken Brownlee, 87, Aberdeen, Third Lanark and St Johnstone wing half.
25 September: Roy MacLaren, 92, St Johnstone goalkeeper.
8 October: John Duncan, 73, Dundee forward.
20 October: Jimmy Millar, 87, Dunfermline Athletic, Rangers, Dundee United and Scotland forward; Raith Rovers manager.
30 October: Sammy Wilson, 85, Falkirk and Dundee forward. 
15 November: Jimmy O'Rourke, 76, Hibernian, St Johnstone and Motherwell forward.
20 November: Norrie Davidson, 88, Aberdeen, Heart of Midlothian, Dundee United, Partick Thistle and St Mirren forward.
c.29 November: Alex Lamond, St Johnstone chairman.
14 December: Alex Duchart, 89, Hibernian, Third Lanark, East Fife, Dumbarton and Falkirk winger.
c.14 December: Jim Boyd, 66, Clyde and Motherwell defender.
1 January: Frank McGarvey, 66, St Mirren, Celtic, Queen of the South, Clyde and Scotland forward; Queen of the South manager.
January: Andy Graham, 66, Dundee United, Forfar Athletic, Raith Rovers, Stirling Albion and Kilmarnock goalkeeper.
23 January: Patrizio Billio, 48, Dundee and Aberdeen midfielder.
6 February: Billy Thomson, 64, Partick Thistle, St Mirren, Dundee United, Clydebank, Motherwell, Rangers, Dundee and Scotland goalkeeper.
21 February: Ron Gordon, 68, Hibernian chairman.
1 March: Allan McGraw, 83, Morton and Hibernian forward; Morton manager.
14 March: Chris Shevlane, 80, Hearts, Celtic, Hibernian and Morton defender.

Retirements

 18 June 2022: Paul Caddis, 34, former Scotland, Celtic and Dundee United defender.
 22 June 2022: Jamie Ness, 31, former Rangers, Dundee and Forfar Athletic midfielder.

Notes and references

 
Seasons in Scottish football
S
S